A New Testament papyrus is a copy of a portion of the New Testament made on papyrus. To date, over 140 such papyri are known. In general, they are considered the earliest witnesses to the original text of the New Testament.

This elite status among New Testament manuscripts only began in the 20th century. The grouping was first introduced by Caspar René Gregory, who assigned papyri texts the Blackletter character 𝔓 followed by a superscript number. This number refers not to the age of the papyrus, but to the order in which it was registered. Before 1900, only 9 papyri manuscripts were known, and only one had been cited in a critical apparatus ( by Constantin von Tischendorf). The discoveries of the twentieth century brought about the earliest known New Testament manuscript fragments. Kenyon in 1912 knew 14 papyri, Aland in his first edition of Kurzgefasste... in 1963 enumerated 76 papyri, in 1989 there were 96 known papyri, and in 2008 124 papyri. As of 2021, a total of 141 papyri are known, although some of the numbers issued were later deemed to be fragments of the same original manuscript.

All of these are thought to date from sometime in the third century.

These early manuscripts are more complete, allowing scholars to better examine their textual character.

Every papyrus is cited in Nestle-Aland Novum Testamentum Graece.

List of all registered New Testament papyri 
 The P-numbers are the standard system of Gregory-Aland.
 Dates are estimated to the year range shown.
 Content is given to the nearest chapter; verses are sometimes listed. Thus, many of the papyri are small fragments, not whole chapters. For instance,  contains 5 verses out of the 40 verses in John chapter 18.

 Digital images are referenced with direct links to the hosting web pages. The quality and accessibility of the images is as follows:

Papyrus 1–50

Papyrus 51–100

Papyrus 101–

Distribution based on content 

Note: "Early" manuscripts are manuscripts dated firmly from the fourth century or earlier. Roughly half of the papyri are "early". Some manuscripts contain content from more than one New Testament book, so the numbers above do not directly correspond to the total number of manuscripts.

See also 

 Lists
 Categories of New Testament manuscripts
List of artifacts significant to the Bible
 List of Egyptian papyri by date
 List of New Testament uncials
 List of New Testament minuscules
 List of New Testament lectionaries
 List of New Testament amulets
 List of New Testament Latin manuscripts
 List of New Testament Church Fathers

 Other articles
 Novum Testamentum Graece
 Oxyrhynchus papyri
 Palaeography
 Papyrology
 Textual criticism

Notes

References 
 
 Nestle-Aland, Novum Testamentum Graece. 27th ed. Deutsche Bibelgesellschaft, 1996
 K. Aland, M. Welte, B. Köster, K. Junack, Kurzgefasste Liste der griechischen Handschriften des Neues Testaments, (Berlin, New York: Walter de Gruyter, 1994), p. 3-17. 
 "Continuation of the Manuscript List" INTF, University of Münster. Retrieved February 4, 2010
 Nestle-Aland. Novum Testamentum Graece. 27th ed. Deutsche Bibelgesellschaft, Druck: 1996, p. 57-63, 684-689
 Law, David R. The Historical-Critical Method: A Guide for the Perplexed, Bloomsbury Publishing, 2012.

External links 
 Dr. J. Lyle Story, professor of Biblical Languages. NT Source Documents & History - Papyri. Retrieved February 27, 2020
Seid, Timothy. "A Table of Greek Manuscripts". Interpreting Ancient Manuscripts. Retrieved June 22, 2007.
 Peter M. Head, Early Greek Bible Manuscript Project: NT Mss. on Papyrus
 Waltz, Robert. "New Testament Manuscripts: Papyri". A Site Inspired By: The Encyclopedia of New Testament Textual Criticism. Retrieved on June 22, 2007.
 Willker, Wieland. "Complete List of Greek NT Papyri" Last Update: 17 April 2008. Retrieved 23 January 2008.
 New Testament Transcripts Prototype
 Wieland Willker, A Textual Commentary on the Greek Gospels: Fragmentary papyri
 Images of manuscripts
 Institut für Altertumskunde 

 
papyri
Greek New Testament manuscripts
Papyrus
Greek-language papyri